Kentucky Route 177 (KY 177) is a  state highway that exists in Kenton and Pendleton counties in the northern part of the U.S. state of Kentucky.

Route description
KY 177 begins at an intersection with KY 159 east of Butler in rural Pendleton County. From there, it winds west and somewhat north, intersecting with U.S. Route 27 (US 27) just north of the Licking River near Morning View. It continues west for a short distance before turning southeast to cross the Licking River at Butler. In town, it turns southeast following Mill Street. It follows Lick Creek south before turning back west and northwest at an intersection with KY 3185. It continues northwest through rural parts of Kenton County intersecting with KY 467 near DeMossville. After another couple of miles, it finally turns more northernly, following the Licking River and intersecting with KY 14 at Morning View, KY 2042 near Kenton. Continuing its path north, it intersects KY 536 coming from the west at Visalia and both roads travel concurrent for a short distance before KY 536 departs to the east. KY 177 continues north through parts of Decoursey, Ryland Heights, and Taylor Mill, before ending at an intersection with KY 16 a short distance south of that highway's intersection with KY 17.Between the Town of Butler and State Highway 3185 South of Butler the road is closed to vehicles over 9 feet 9 inches due to a narrow and low bridge.

History

Major intersections

See also

References

0177
Transportation in Kenton County, Kentucky